Pleurothallis cardiothallis is a species of orchid plant native to Central America.

References 

cardiothallis
Orchids of Central America
Orchids of Belize
Flora of Belize
Flora of Colombia
Flora of Costa Rica
Flora of Ecuador
Flora of El Salvador
Flora of Guatemala
Flora of Honduras
Flora of Mexico
Flora of Nicaragua
Flora of Panama